Susan Owen ( Cleaver; born 2 September 1963) is an English actress. She is best known for portraying the role of Eileen Grimshaw on the ITV soap opera, Coronation Street, which she has played since 2000.

Early and personal life
Cleaver was born on 2 September 1963 in Barnet, Hertfordshire. Cleaver is adopted, however later reconnected with her birth mother when she was in her twenties, and discovered her two half-sisters, actresses Emma and Kate Harbour.

Cleaver was married to James Quinn between 1993 and 2003 and they have a son together, Elliot, born in 1998. She later married Brian Owen, lighting technician, after meeting him on the set of Coronation Street.

In March 2010, Cleaver was arrested for drink-driving and as a result was banned from driving for seventeen months and ordered to pay a £1,000 fine.

Career
She studied at the Manchester Metropolitan School of Theatre and her first television appearance was a small part in an episode of A Touch of Frost. She went on to star in the acclaimed drama series Band of Gold before landing a role in the film Girls' Night alongside Julie Walters and Brenda Blethyn.

In 1998, she played Duty Sgt. Standish in the first series of The Cops, and also played Glenda, a woman delivering baked goods in Victoria Wood's BBC comedy series, dinnerladies on a recurring basis between 1999 and 2000. She appeared as PC Sylvia Holland in This Is Personal: The Hunt for the Yorkshire Ripper miniseries in 2000. She also had a small part in the Johnny Depp and Cate Blanchett film The Man Who Cried. It was after filming that role in 2000 that she was cast as Eileen Grimshaw on Coronation Street. Cleaver won praise for her portrayal of Eileen, the mother of a son, Todd, who struggles with his sexuality and announces he is gay.

Cleaver covered for Denise Robertson as the agony aunt on the ITV daytime programme This Morning until Robertson's death in 2016. Cleaver completed three years of training to become a psychotherapist after co-stars told her she was good at listening.

In 2022, Cleaver was a contestant on the twenty-second series of I'm a Celebrity...Get Me Out of Here!, and came 9th.

Charity
Cleaver is patron of the charity When You Wish Upon a Star.

Filmography

Awards and nominations

See also
List of I'm a Celebrity...Get Me Out of Here! (British TV series) contestants

References

External links

Sue Cleaver at the British Film Institute

1963 births
Living people
English television actresses
English soap opera actresses
Actresses from Hertfordshire
Actresses from Manchester
20th-century English actresses
21st-century English actresses
I'm a Celebrity...Get Me Out of Here! (British TV series) participants